Walter Franklyn Barrett (1873 – 16 July 1964), better known as Franklyn Barrett, was an Australian film director and cinematographer. He worked for a number of years for West's Pictures. It was later written of the filmmaker that "Barrett's visual ingenuity was to be the highlight of all his work, but... his direction of actors was less assured".

Biography
Barrett was born in Loughborough, Leicestershire, England, and was raised by his aunt. He was a professional violin player and amateur photographer and claims to have seen the first exhibit of motion pictures at the Empire Theatre in London.

Barrett moved to New Zealand with his brother and father to work as a clerk for the latter.  He began to experiment with shooting movies, and in 1901 won a prize of £15 for some of his photos. Barrett accompanied the Duke of York on his 1901 tour of Australia in capacity as photographer. He worked for eight months with the Charles Urban Trading Co. Ltd in England and moved to Australia in 1904, where he worked for several theatre companies.

Barrett was the first person to film the Melbourne Cup from start to finish in 1904, and shot several "scenic movies" for the New Zealand and New South Wales railways.

He joined the Melbourne office of Pathé Frères in 1908 and stayed with them when West's Pictures took over in 1911.

Barrett began directing movies for West's, starting with The Christian (1911). In 1913 West's merged with Australasian Films and Barrett joined the Fraser Film Release and Photographic Company. In 1920 he formed his own film company with solicitor Barry Kenward, with whom he made three features. This company eventually folded in May 1922 and Barrett moved into theatre management, running the Capitol Theatre in Canberra in 1925, then various cinemas for Hoyts Theatres from 1927 onwards.

Personal life
Born Walter Franklyn Brown, son of William Brown and Matilda, née Hopwell,
Barrett was already a widower by the time he married Mabel Muriel Pile in Perth on 10 December 1906. She predeceased him but the daughter they had together, Harrie "Todds" Barrett, survived him. Todds Barrett went on to become a successful businesswoman.

Franklyn and Mabel's house at 6 Barrett Place Randwick, their home from 1911–26, has a Bicentennial commemorative plaque.

Select filmography
Dummy Mace (1901) – cinematographer, director – a staged 3 round boxing match 
A Message from Mars (1903) – cinematographer, director
Ally Sloper as a conjuror (1903) – cinematographer, director
Ally Sloper on Holiday (1903) – cinematographer, director
Ally Sloper at the Races (1903) – cinematographer, director
The Melbourne Cup (1904) – cinematographer, director
The Sea Coasts of New Zealand (1908) – cinematographer
The Christian (1911) – cinematographer, director
All for Gold, or Jumping the Claim (1911) – cinematographer, director
The Strangler's Grip (1912) – cinematographer
The Mystery of the Black Pearl (1912) – cinematographer
The Eleventh Hour (1912) – cinematographer
A Silent Witness (1912) – cinematographer, director
The Life of a Jackeroo (1913) – cinematographer, director
Pommy Arrives in Australia (1913) – cinematographer
A Blue Gum Romance (1913) – cinematographer, director
The Pioneers (1916) – cinematographer, director
The Joan of Arc of Loos (1916) – cinematographer
The Mutiny of the Bounty (1916) – cinematographer
The Murder of Captain Fryatt (1917) – cinematographer
The Monk and the Woman (1917) – director
cinematographer for unknown film for Antipodes Film Productions directed by C.B. Coates
Australia's Peril (1917) – cinematographer, director
The Enemy Within (1918) – cinematographer
A Romance of Burke and Wills Expedition of 1860 (1918) – cinematographer
The Lure of the Bush (1918) – cinematographer
Struck Oil (1919) – director
The Breaking of the Drought (1920) – cinematographer, director
A Girl of the Bush (1921) – cinematographer, director
Know Thy Child (1921) – cinematographer, director
A Rough Passage (1922) – cinematographer, director

References

External links
 
Franklyn Barrett at Australian Dictionary of Biography
Article on Barrett's 1925 Tour of Queensland
Franklyn Barrett at Trove
Franklyn Barrett items at National Film and Sound Archive

1900s in New Zealand cinema
Australian film directors
Australian cinematographers
1873 births
1964 deaths